Chatyr-Köl is an endorheic alpine lake in the Tian Shan mountains in At-Bashy District of Naryn Province, Kyrgyzstan; it lies in the lower part of Chatyr-Köl Depression near the Torugart Pass border crossing into China. The name of the lake means “Celestial Lake” in Kyrgyz (literally "Roof Lake").

Climate
Some 88-90% of the lake basin's 208–269 mm of annual precipitation  falls in summer. From October to end of April the lake surface freezes, the ice becoming as much as 0.25-1.5 m thick.

Hydrology
The mineralization of the lake ranges from 0.5 to 1.0 milligrams per liter (chloride, hydrocarbonate, sodium and magnesium type of mineralization). The salinity of the lake is 2 ppt.

Negative water balance of the lake over the last decades causes the decline in the lake level. The mineral water from the sources is cold and has a strong mineral taste and flow first into the small Chatyr Kul lake that is about 1,5 meters higher than the actual Chatyr Kul.

Protection
Since 1998, a section of the lake and its shore (3,200 ha land, 3,954 ha water) is protected as part of the Karatal-Japyryk Nature Reserve. The whole lake is a game reserve (IUCN category IV) since 1972. The game reserve was established to protect water fowl, including the bar-headed goose. The lake is a Ramsar site of globally significant biodiversity (Ramsar Site RDB Code 2KG002).

Gallery

References

Lakes of Kyrgyzstan
Ramsar sites in Kyrgyzstan
Endorheic lakes of Asia
Mountain lakes
Tian Shan
Game reserves in Kyrgyzstan
Protected areas established in 1972